James or Jim McIntyre may refer to:
 James Francis McIntyre (1886–1979), American prelate of the Roman Catholic Church
 James McIntyre (poet) (1828–1906), Canadian poet called "The Cheese Poet"
 James McIntyre (theatrical actor) (1857–1937), American minstrel performer, vaudeville and theatrical actor
 James McIntyre (footballer) (1863–1943), Scottish footballer called "Tuck McIntyre"
 James McIntyre (politician) (1930–1984), American attorney and politician in Massachusetts
 James Gordon McIntyre, Lord Sorn (1896–1983), Scottish law lord
 James L. McIntyre (1926–2015), mayor of Sault Ste. Marie, Ontario
 James M. McIntyre (1918–1991), member of the Pennsylvania House of Representatives
 James P. McIntyre (1883–1957), political figure on Prince Edward Island
 James T. McIntyre (born 1940), American economist, director of the United States' Office of Management and Budget
 James A. McIntyre (born 1938), American lawyer
 Jimmy McIntyre (1877–1959), English footballer and team manager
 Jim McIntyre (basketball) (1927–2005), American college basketball player
 Jim McIntyre (footballer) (born 1972), Scottish footballer
 Jim McIntyre (musician), American musician
 Jim McIntyre (bowls), Scottish lawn and indoor bowler
 Laurence McIntyre (1912–1981), Australian diplomat, known as Jim

See also 
James McIntire (disambiguation)
Len McIntyre (James Leonard McIntyre, 1933–2012), English rugby player